Atula Thiri Maha Yaza Dewi of Ava (also known as Atula Maha Dhamma Yaza Dewi) was the chief queen consort of King Narapati I of Ava from 1442 to 1468. She was the mother of King Thihathura of Ava and King Thado Minsaw of Prome, and a maternal aunt of King Leik Munhtaw of Hanthawaddy. King Alaungpaya, the founder of the Konbaung dynasty, was a tenth generation descendant of the queen.

She became the queen dowager in 1468 after her husband died from a stab wound by one of her grandsons. She instigated a rebellion by Toungoo (Taungoo) when her son Thihathura, who was now king, failed to punish the grandson.

Brief
She was the chief consort of Narapati (then known as Thihathu), Viceroy of Prome, from 1429 to 1442. The family moved to Ava (Inwa) in 1442 when her husband succeeded the throne. The couple had to flee Ava 25 years later in June 1467 after Thado Kyaw, one of their grandsons, stabbed Narapati, They never returned to Ava. The king never fully recovered from the stab wound, and died a year later at Prome. She was shocked when her son Thihathura, who was now king, failed to punish his son Thado Kyaw. She nursed a grudge, and in 1470, instigated Letya Zeya Thingyan, Viceroy of Toungoo, to revolt. The rebellion however failed. The chronicles do not say whether or not the queen dowager was punished by her son the king.

Ancestry
The queen was the youngest child of Saw Min Pu and Gov. Thinkhaya of Pagan. She was descended from the Pagan royal line—she was a great-granddaughter of King Kyawswa of Pagan. She was a half cousin as well as niece of King Minkhaung I of Ava although she was about four decades younger. She had four siblings. Her eldest sibling Saw Shwe Khet was viceroy of Prome (Pyay) from 1417 to 1422 and from 1442 to 1446. Her elder sister Soe Min Wimala Dewi was queen of Hanthawaddy Pegu.

Family
She and Narapati had three sons and five daughters.

Notes

References

Bibliography
 
 
 

Chief queens consort of Ava
15th-century Burmese women